Flo Fox (born Florence Blossom Fox, September 26, 1945, in Miami Beach Florida), is an American street photographer.  Diagnosed with multiple sclerosis at age 30, Fox, now 77 and completely paralyzed, still works as a photographer, having attendants, friends, and strangers take photos for her with an autofocus camera.

Career 

Throughout her career and with an archive of over 130,000 works, Fox photographed various subjects in New York City. Her work is in the permanent collection of the Brooklyn Museum and the Smithsonian. Her images have appeared in LIFE Magazine, New York Magazine and been exhibited in Paris, London, Barcelona and Mexico. Fox has also been interviewed on several talks shows, including Regis and Kathy Lee and Tom Snyder. Photographer Richard Young credited Fox with "giving [him] the confidence to pick-up the camera". 

During the early 1980s, she hosted her own show called the Foto Flo Show, interviewing other photographers such as Ruth Orkin and Ralph Gibson on their work and their creative methods. Riley Hooper made a short documentary film, FLO, which was featured in The New York Times in 2013.  

Fox is a disability advocate and has taught photography class for the blind and visually impaired students at the Lighthouse for the Blind. Despite blindness, multiple sclerosis, and lung cancer, she continues to photograph the streets of New York City.

References 

Photographers from Florida
Street photographers

1945 births
Living people